Zendan or Zandan may refer to:
 Zendan, Kerman
 Zandan, Kurdistan

See also
 Zindan, Iran